Justus Torsutsey (born 3 September 1992 in Accra)  is a Ghanaian footballer.

Club career 
Torsutsey played his youth career with  Abreshia United, before transferring to Ghana Premier League club Tudu Mighty Jets, where he began his senior and professional career. Signed with Ghanaian top-flight side Sekondi Hasaacas in January 2016.

In 2018, Torsutsey signed Ebusua Dwarfs. He made 6 league appearances his spell at the club.

Torsutsey debuted for Ebusua Dwarfs in the 2018 Ghanaian Premier League season on 24 March 2018 in a 0–0 draw against Wa All Stars at the Wa Sports Stadium.

References

External links
 
 Mackolik Profile

1992 births
Living people
Footballers from Accra
Ghanaian footballers
Association football forwards
Tudu Mighty Jets FC players
Ebusua Dwarfs players
Ghana Premier League players
Sekondi Hasaacas F.C. players